Hollenstein is a surname. Notable people with the surname include:

Denis Hollenstein (born 1989), Swiss ice hockey player
Felix Hollenstein (born 1965), Swiss ice hockey player
Hans Hollenstein (born 1929), Swiss cyclist
Reto Hollenstein (born 1985), Swiss cyclist
Tommy Hollenstein, American painter and sculptor

See also
Holenstein

German toponymic surnames